Timo Bracht (born July 22, 1975 in Waldbrunn) is an Athlete from Germany, who competed in triathlon. Several times Ironman champion and European Long Distance Triathlon Champion (2012). Timo Bracht is in the list of the Bestenliste deutscher Triathleten auf der Ironman-Distanz

Career 
Timo Bracht started his Triathlon career in 1993 and celebrated in 2003 winning the Ironman France in Gérardmer his first title as professional Triathlete.

Professional Triathlete since 1994 
Since 1994 he started as professional Triathlete and in 2004 he achieved 8th place at the Ironman World Championship in Kona, Hawai. Later on he reached 3rd place in Roth and competed in 2005 in Kona achieving position 53.cht wiederholen und wurde nur 53.

European Ironman Champion 2007

European Long Distance Triathlon Champion 2012

Athletic achievements 

(DNF – Did Not Finish; DSQ – Disqualifikation)

Publications 
 Die Triathlonbibel: Das Standardwerk für alle Triathleten, von Timo Bracht, Niclas Bock, Nina Eggert, Caroline Cornfine, u. a., spomedis (31. März 2015),

References

External links

 Porträt Timo Bracht auf Trib2b.com

1975 births
Living people
German male triathletes
People from Neckar-Odenwald-Kreis
Sportspeople from Karlsruhe (region)